The 12th Annual American Music Awards were held on January 28, 1985.

Winners and nominees

References

 http://www.rockonthenet.com/archive/1985/amas.htm

1985